The Buffalo and Niagara Falls Railroad was a part of the New York Central Railroad system, connecting Buffalo, New York to Niagara Falls. It is still used by CSX for freight and Amtrak for passenger service.

History
The Buffalo and Black Rock Railroad was chartered in 1833 and opened in 1834, operating a horse-powered line from downtown Buffalo north to Black Rock, now the east end of the International Bridge. The line was mostly built on state land next to the Erie Canal.

The Buffalo and Niagara Falls Railroad was incorporated in 1834 to take over the Buffalo and Black Rock and extend it north and northwest to Niagara Falls. Construction began in August 1836, and included a replacement of the low-quality rails of the horse-drawn line. By 1837 the extension to Tonawanda was completed, and around 1840 the rest of the way to Niagara Falls opened.

In or soon after 1852, the new Erie Street terminal was built in downtown Buffalo, along with a relocation of the tracks near downtown to the west side of the Erie Canal.

In 1853 the newly formed New York Central Railroad leased the Buffalo and Niagara Falls, which at the time did not connect to any other NYC lines. It was merged into the NYC in 1855.

Tonawanda also served as a junction with several other lines. The Canandaigua and Niagara Falls Railroad opened to Tonawanda in 1853, and in 1854 built a connection from the Niagara Falls end of the Buffalo and Niagara Falls to the Niagara Falls Suspension Bridge into Canada. The New York Central bought the Canandaigua and Niagara Falls in 1858. The Buffalo and Lockport Railroad opened in 1854, connecting the Buffalo and Niagara Falls at Tonawanda to the NYC's Lockport and Niagara Falls Railroad at Lockport.

The Junction Railroad opened in 1871, finally connecting the Buffalo and Niagara Falls at Black Rock to the New York Central and Hudson River Railroad main line via a bypass of downtown Buffalo. In 1873 a connection was built downtown (partly using a short piece of the Lake Shore and Michigan Southern Railway), forming a complete loop, known as the Buffalo Belt Line. The old Erie Street station was sold to the Grand Trunk Railway, and NYC trains now used the Exchange Street station, which had been used since 1842 by the NYC's main line.

The International Bridge opened in 1874, connecting the Buffalo and Niagara Falls at Black Rock to Ontario, Canada.

Between 1900 and 1943, a realignment was made in southern Tonawanda, eliminating a bridge over the Erie Canal (Tonawanda Creek). The new longer alignment turned east south of downtown, and then north parallel to the Erie Railroad's Suspension Bridge and Erie Junction Railroad, merging with the old Canandaigua and Niagara Falls Railroad south of its bridge over the canal.

Between 1948 and 1962, a bypass of Niagara Falls was built. This left the old alignment about halfway from Tonawanda and headed north to the NYC's old Rochester, Lockport and Niagara Falls Railroad, where trains turned west to Niagara Falls. The old alignment was abandoned, and part of it was used in 1970 for the LaSalle Expressway.

The line passed into the hands of Penn Central in 1968 and Conrail in 1976, by then known as the Niagara Branch. The 1998 Conrail breakup assigned the Buffalo-Niagara Falls line to New York Central Lines LLC, a subsidiary of CSX. CSX operates it, along with the old connection to the New York Central main line, and the connection to the Whirlpool Rapids Bridge and Michigan Central Railway Bridge (via the old Rochester, Lockport and Niagara Falls Railroad), as their Niagara Subdivision.

Amtrak's Empire Service and Maple Leaf carry passengers along the full line, the latter continuing to Toronto, Ontario, Canada.

See also

New York Central Niagara River Railroad, a short branch north of Black Rock

References

External links
Railroad History Database
Past Tracks: A Queen City Built by Rail

Predecessors of the New York Central Railroad
Defunct New York (state) railroads
Transportation in Buffalo, New York
Railway companies established in 1834
Railway companies disestablished in 1869
American companies established in 1834
American companies disestablished in 1869